Curtis Chip Kell (born March 10, 1949) is an American former professional football player who was a center in the Canadian Football League (CFL). He played college football for the Tennessee Volunteers. Kell was elected to the College Football Hall of Fame in 2006.

High school 
In 1966, Kell set the Georgia All Classifications record for Avondale High School in the shot put, at a distance of 66' 7", which is a record that stood for 50 years until broken in 2016 by Isaiah Rogers of Campbell High School.

College career 
Kell was a three-time All-SEC and two-time consensus All-American performer at the University of Tennessee. He helped lead the Volunteers to an SEC Championship in 1969.  During Kell's time in Knoxville, Tennessee was undefeated at Shields–Watkins Field.  In 2006, Kell was inducted into the College Football Hall of Fame, making him the 20th Tennessee player to be inducted.

Professional career 
Kell was drafted in the 17th round of the 1971 NFL Draft by the San Diego Chargers. He played for the Edmonton Eskimos of the CFL in 1971 and 1972.

References

External links 
 College Football Hall of Fame page

1949 births
Living people
All-American college football players
College Football Hall of Fame inductees
Edmonton Elks players
Players of American football from Atlanta
Tennessee Volunteers football players